The Free State women's cricket team, previously known as Orange Free State women's cricket team, is the women's representative cricket team for the South African province of Free State. They compete in the Women's Provincial Programme and the CSA Women's Provincial T20 Competition.

History
The side first played as Orange Free State in the 1952–53 season of the Simon Trophy, losing in the final of the competition. As Free State, they first appeared in the 1996–97 season of the Women's Inter-Provincial Tournament, although the full results for the tournament are unrecorded. They have competed in every season of the tournament since. They reached the quarter-finals of the competition in 2004–05, as well as finishing 4th in both 2007–08 and 2018–19.

They have also competed in the CSA Women's Provincial T20 Competition since its inception in 2012–13, including finishing 4th in the first competition. They have also finished third in the Top 6 league of the competition twice, in 2016–17 and 2019–20.

Players

Current squad
Based on squad announced for the 2021–22 season. Players in bold have international caps.

Notable players
Players who have played for Free State and played internationally are listed below, in order of first international appearance (given in brackets):

  Cindy Eksteen (1997)
  Leslie Korkie (1997)
  Cri-Zelda Brits (2002)
  Susan Benade (2005)
  Annelie Minny (2007)
  Masabata Klaas (2010)
  Yolandi Potgieter (2013)
  Anneke Bosch (2016)
  Annerie Dercksen (2023)

Honours
 CSA Women's Provincial Programme:
 Winners (0): 
 Best finish: 4th (2007–08 & 2018–19)
 CSA Women's Provincial T20 Competition:
 Winners (0):
 Best finish: 3rd (2016–17 & 2019–20)

See also
 Free State (cricket team)

References

Women's cricket teams in South Africa
Cricket in the Free State (province)